Rogue Valley International–Medford Airport  is a public-use airport three miles north of downtown Medford, in Jackson County, Oregon, United States. Owned and operated by Jackson County's Aviation Authority, the airport serves southwest Oregon. Originally named Medford–Jackson County Airport, it was renamed to Rogue Valley International–Medford Airport after it became an international airport in 1994.

In December of 2018, the airport celebrated its 1 million+ annual passenger milestone. In doing so Medford joined both PDX and EUG as the only Oregon airports to have surpassed 1 million passengers in a year. By virtue of annual commercial passengers, Rogue Valley International–Medford Airport is the third busiest airport in Oregon with 1,010,920 passenger enplanements and deplanements in 2018 (behind Eugene and Portland). The National Plan of Integrated Airport Systems for 2011–2015 categorized it as a primary commercial service airport (more than 10,000 enplanements per year).

Facilities
The airport covers 938 acres (380 ha) at an elevation of 1,335 feet (407 m). Its runway, 14/32, is 8,800 by 150 feet (2,682 x 46 m) asphalt.

The airport underwent renovations which included a new  terminal building with room for expansion; work completed in 2009 and designed by CSHQA and the Abell Architectural Group Inc.  The new terminal has an observation deck on the second floor, a restaurant for screened and unscreened passengers, and second-story loading bridges. Now that the terminal is complete, there is a main concourse, and two open air concourses. A new control tower was completed in late 2008; the $3.6 million,  tower uses a state-of-the-art geothermal system to heat and cool the building.

Two fixed-base operators (FBOs) provide general aviation services on the field: Jet Center MFR, and Million Air (which recently completed its new three-story corporate terminal). 

In the year ending December 31, 2020, the airport had 41,563 aircraft operations, average 114 per day: 59% general aviation, 22% airline, 16% air taxi, and less than 1% military. 201 aircraft at the time were based at the airport: 139 single-engine, 25 multi-engine, 22 jet, 15 helicopter, and 5 glider.

The Medford airport continues to post favorable passenger statistics; following monthly gains in 2019 the facility served 1,087,873 arriving and departing passengers (increase of 7.6% over 2018 statistic).

Airline service present and past
Alaska Airlines offers nonstops to Portland and Seattle/Tacoma. Nonstops to Denver, Los Angeles and San Francisco, flown by SkyWest Airlines operating as United Express, use Bombardier CRJ200 and Embraer 175 regional jets as well as the Airbus A320 and Boeing 737-900 for select San Francisco, LAX, and Denver flights.  Delta Connection, operated by Skywest Airlines, flies nonstop to Salt Lake City and Seattle/Tacoma with the Embraer 175. Allegiant Air flies nonstop to  Las Vegas and Los Angeles, and seasonally to Phoenix/Mesa, using the Airbus A319.

Medford was served by United Airlines Boeing 727-200s and 737-200s, by Hughes Airwest (formerly Air West) Douglas DC-9-10s and DC-9-30s, by Pacific Express BAC One-Elevens, and by Pacific Southwest Airlines BAe 146-200s. The PSA service was continued by USAir (later renamed US Airways) after it acquired PSA. USAir later ended service to Medford though US Airways Express did serve Medford later with regional jets. The predecessor of Air West and Hughes Airwest, West Coast Airlines, served the airport in the 1960s with Douglas DC-9s and Fairchild F-27s. West Coast merged with Pacific Air Lines and Bonanza Air Lines to form Air West. In the late 1980s and early 1990s United Express operated as NPA, West Air and Mesa flying British Aerospace Jetstreams (19 seat turboprops) directly to both Portland and Seattle. Continental Airlines also served MFR in the late 1980s with MD-82 aircraft.

Airlines and destinations

Passenger

Cargo

Statistics

Top destinations

Airline market share

Accidents and incidents
On January 7, 2008, a US Airways Express jet arriving from Las Vegas struck and killed a coyote. No passenger injuries occurred, and possibly no passenger noticed the collision.

References

 http://www.mailtribune.com/news/20171114/new-options-emerging-at-medford-airport

Notes

External links
 Airport website
 Businesses at MFR: Million Air Medford, Medford Air Service, Jet Center MFR, Mercy Flights
 
 
 

Medford, Oregon
Airports in Jackson County, Oregon